D. J. Steward (born October 2, 2001) is an American professional basketball player for the Stockton Kings of the NBA G League. He played college basketball for the Duke Blue Devils. He was a consensus five-star recruit and one of the best shooting guards in the 2020 class. He finished his high school career at Whitney M. Young Magnet High School in Chicago, Illinois.

High school career
Steward first attended Fenwick High School in Oak Park, Illinois In 2018, he transferred to Whitney Young High School in Chicago, Illinois for his remaining years of high school. Steward averaged 24.1 points, 4.6 rebounds and 3.1 assists per game in the 2019 Nike EYBL circuit. In the Highland Shootout versus Christian Brothers College High School in January 2020, Steward scored a shootout-high 40 points including the game-tying bucket in a 66–64 victory. He was named a McDonald's All-American.

Recruiting
On September 18, 2019, Steward committed to play at Duke University. He chose the Blue Devils over offers from DePaul, Illinois, Indiana, Iowa State, Louisville, North Carolina and Texas.

College career
Steward started 22 games and played in 24 games during Duke’s 2020-21 season. A 6’2 combo guard, he averaged 13 points, 3.9 rebounds and 2.4 assists per game.

The Duke team finished that season 13-11, with a 9-9 record in the ACC. It was the first year since 1995 that the Blue Devils were not invited to the NCAA tournament. 

While the season did not live up to Duke’s usual expectations, Steward had multiple highlights during his only year on the team. In his college debut on November 28, 2020, Steward scored 24 points in an 81–71 win against Coppin State. On December 21, 2020, Steward was named Atlantic Coast Conference rookie of the week. On January 15, 2021, Steward scored 26 points and grabbed 6 rebounds in a 79–68 win over Wake Forest.

Professional career

Stockton Kings (2021–present)
After a very successful freshman season at Duke, Steward debated going professional. At 6’2”, Steward was seen as having a shooting guard’s skills in a point guard’s body, and this led to a sense that he would need to develop point guard skills before he could effectively play in the NBA. Nevertheless, he decided to make himself available for the NBA draft. 

After going undrafted in the 2021 NBA draft, Steward was invited to the Sacramento Kings for the 2021 NBA Summer League. On September 28, 2021, he signed a contract with the Kings. He was waived prior to the start of the season. Steward signed with the Stockton Kings of the NBA G League as an affiliate player for the 2021-22 season.

Career statistics

College

|-
| style="text-align:left;"| 2020–21
| style="text-align:left;"| Duke
| 24 || 22 || 30.8 || .426 || .341 || .811 || 4.0 || 2.4 || 1.1 || .6 || 13.0

Personal life
Steward is the son of Katicha Jackson-Williams and Danny Boy Steward and stepson of Tyrone Williams. named after his father, who was a former Death Row recording artist. He also played football in high school, and has a brother, Trent. Steward grew up in Oak Park, Illinois where he attended Brooks Middle School. He attended Fenwick his freshman and sophomore years, then transferred to Whitney Young for his last two years. He played travel ball since his middle school years with Meanstreets and played eybl circuit, where he made an even bigger name for himself.

References

External links
Duke Blue Devils bio
USA Basketball bio

2001 births
Living people
21st-century African-American sportspeople
African-American basketball players
American men's basketball players
Duke Blue Devils men's basketball players
Basketball players from Chicago
McDonald's High School All-Americans
Shooting guards
Stockton Kings players